Synchronized Rockers is tribute album recorded by various artists covering songs by The Pillows. It was released on September 16, 2004, celebrating the band's 15th anniversary.

Track listing
"Runners High" (by Straightener)
"Funny Bunny" (by Ellegarden)
"Paris no Josei Marii (巴里の女性マリー)", by The Pees with Kazuyuki Kuhara)
"Vain Dog (In Rain Drop)" (by Noodles)
"Kono Yo no Hate Made (この世の果てまで)", by Yo-King)
"Carnival (カーニバル)", by Chikuzen Sato)
"Little Busters" (by Going Under Ground)
"Our Love and Peace" (by Salon Music)
"Hybrid Rainbow" (by Bump of Chicken)
"Strange Chameleon" (by Mr. Children)
"Sad Sad Kiddie" (by Yuta, Toshi, Chiho and Jiro's session, from Glay)

Alternative rock albums by Japanese artists
Tribute albums
2004 compilation albums